The 2007 Furman Paladins football team was an American football team that represented Furman University as a member of the Southern Conference (SoCon) during the 2007 NCAA Division I FCS football season. In their sixth year under head coach Bobby Lamb, the Paladins compiled an overall record of 6–5 with a conference mark of 4–3, finishing tied for third in the SoCon.

Schedule

References

Furman
Furman Paladins football seasons
Furman Paladins football